The 1919 Ayvalık earthquake struck Balıkesir Province in the Ottoman Empire on 18 November. Many homes, minarets and public buildings in Soma, Bergama, Ayvalık, Lesbos, Edremit and Balikesir were damaged or collapsed. An estimated 3,000 people were killed and 16,000 buildings were heavily damaged.

See also
 List of earthquakes in 1919
 List of earthquakes in Turkey

References

External links

Earthquakes in Turkey
1919 in the Ottoman Empire
History of Balıkesir Province
1919 earthquakes
1919 disasters in Asia